Özgür Özkaya (born 8 February 1988) is a Turkish footballer who plays as a defender for Altay.

References

 Özgür Özkaya, Boluspor'da, yenimesaj.com, 31 December 2015

External links

1988 births
Living people
Turkish footballers
Elazığspor footballers
Süper Lig players
Association football defenders